Biological Research for Nursing is a peer-reviewed nursing journal that focuses on biological research applied to nursing. The editor-in-chief is Carolyn Yucha (University of Nevada, Las Vegas). The journal was established in 1999 and is published by SAGE Publications.

Abstracting and indexing 
The journal is abstracted and indexed in Scopus and the Science Citation Index Expanded. According to the Journal Citation Reports, its 2014 impact factor is 1.427, ranking it 22 out of 110 journals in the category ‘Nursing’.

References

External links 
 

SAGE Publishing academic journals
English-language journals
General nursing journals
Quarterly journals
Publications established in 1999